Penny is the second studio album by Austrian-born singer Penny McLean released in 1977. Three solo singles were released before the album launched: "Nobody's Child", "Zwischen Zwei Gefühlen" and "Dance, Bunny Honey, Dance", but only the last one was included in the final track list. At the same time, Penny also sang on Silver Convention, and the group's single: "The Boys from Liverpool" was released, after that she announcing her departure from the group. The album managed to chart in Sweden. Reviews for the album were mixed, and its second single (Mambo Mama) didn't chart anywhere. An unofficial CD was released in Russia.

Track listing

Charts

References

1977 albums
Penny McLean albums